Timothy L. "Tim" Johnson (born December 2, 1959) is an American politician. Johnson was a member of the Mississippi State Senate representing District 19 from 1995 to 2003 as a Republican. The district encompassed Attala, Leake and Madison counties.

Johnson announced on February 4, 2015, that he was switching to the Democratic Party to run for lieutenant governor. He was a Madison alderman before he was elected to the state Senate in 1995. He served two terms in the Senate but did not seek reelection in 2003 because his Senate district was broken apart when legislative maps were redrawn after the 2000 U.S. Census. He was a Madison County supervisor from 2004 to 2012.

Early life, education and career
Tim Johnson was born in Kosciusko in Attala County, Mississippi on December 2, 1959. Johnson attended Kosciusko High School and Mississippi State University. Johnson is an insurance agent and realtor.

Party switch
Johnson cites underfunded schools, refusal to repair infrastructure, the pay gap between men and women, and corruption as reasons why he switched from the Republican Party to the Democratic Party.

However, the primary reason Johnson attributes his decision to switch parties is Republican leadership's refusal to expand Medicaid in Mississippi.

State Senate
In 1995, Johnson won the District 19 Senate election. He served until 2003. Johnson consistently supported legislation to support the Mississippi Highway Patrol, Bureau of Narcotics and local law enforcement officers.

Committee assignments
Johnson was Vice Chairman of the Forestry Committee. He served with diction on the Finance, Insurance, Juvenile Justice, Municipalities and Veterans and Military Affairs Committees. Johnson was subcommittee Chairman of the Committee on Enrolled Bills, this committee experience representing substantial legislative influence.

Political campaigns

2011 Transportation Commissioner
In 2011, he lost in the Republican primary for Central District Transportation Commissioner.

2015 Lieutenant Governor
On February 4, 2015, Johnson announced his candidacy for Lieutenant Governor against Republican incumbent Tate Reeves.

Positions on issues
Johnson identifies as a Democrat. Johnson supports full funding of Mississippi public schools. He supports equal pay for equal work, and advocates for improvements in infrastructure. In his 2015 Lieutenant Governor race, Johnson said he fully supports expanding Medicaid, and accepting the federal money to support Mississippi's local hospitals.

In a Senate Resolution commending his "outstanding legislative record and dedicated service," Johnson is described as a champion of law enforcement, school choice and issues enhancing municipal government.

Personal life
Johnson and his wife, Lynn, have three children. Johnson and his family reside in Madison, Mississippi. Johnson is a member of Highlands Presbyterian Church, the Madison Arts Guild, Very Special Arts in Mississippi, and the Committee for the March of Dimes. He is well known for his impersonation of Mississippi-born singer Elvis Presley.

References

Living people
Mississippi Democrats
Businesspeople from Mississippi
People from Kosciusko, Mississippi
1959 births
Mississippi Republicans
Mississippi state senators
Mississippi city council members
County supervisors in Mississippi
American Presbyterians
People from Madison, Mississippi